Liridon is an Albanian male given name shared by the following people: 

Liridon Ahmeti (born 16 July 1985 in Vushtrri), a Kosovar-Albanian footballer who plays as a defender
Liridon Kalludra (born 5 November 1991), a Swedish footballer who plays as a midfielder
Liridon Krasniqi (born 1 January 1992), a Kosovo Albanian footballer
Liridon Latifi (born 6 February 1994), an Albanian professional footballer who plays as a midfielder
Liridon Leci, a Kosovo Albanian footballer
Liridon Osmanaj (born 4 January 1992 in Maribor), a Slovenian footballer
Liridon Selmani (born 12 June 1992), an Albanian footballer who plays as a forward
Liridon Vocaj (born 1 October 1993), an Albanian football midfielder

Albanian masculine given names